Mark Golley (born 28 October 1962) is a former professional footballer who played in The Football League for Maidstone United.

References

1962 births
Footballers from Beckenham
English footballers
English Football League players
Living people
Sutton United F.C. players
Maidstone United F.C. (1897) players
Welling United F.C. players
Association football central defenders